Walter Anthony "Tony" Bradford (born March 3, 1989), better known by his stage name Montana of 300 (or simply Montana), is an American rapper, singer and songwriter from Chicago, Illinois. His debut studio album, Fire in the Church, was released on May 20, 2016. He is best known for his rap style, incorporating trap, R&B, and drill beats, while also making remixes to hit songs that, like his originals, often include religious subtext.

Since releasing Fire in the Church, Montana has committed to releasing an album every year on May 20. The significance of the date is unknown. His second album, Don't Doubt the God, was released on May 20, 2017, and his third album, Pray 4 the Devil, was released on May 20, 2018. His fourth album, A Gun In The Teacher’s Desk, was released on November 16, 2018, and on May 20, 2019, Montana would release his fifth album, Views from the General's Helmet.

Montana has repeatedly announced that his sixth album, Rap God, would be his final solo release. After several delays dating back to 2019, the album was finally released on January 6, 2022.

Early life
Tony Bradford was born on March 3, 1989, in Chicago, Illinois. He has two brothers and three sisters. He started rapping at age 15, and grew up listening to artists such as Tupac, DMX, Lil Wayne, and Jay-Z. Both his parents suffered from serious substance abuse issues, his father from alcohol and his mother from crack cocaine. After witnessing his parents' struggles, Montana ceased using narcotics, not wanting to "fry his brain."

In 2008, Montana, his friend from high school, Montelle Talley (known professionally as "Talley of 300"), as well as several others joined together to form the rap group "300". The name for the group was based on the movie of the same name, in which a group of 300 Spartans overcome more than 300,000 Persian Soldiers to hold on to their territory. Montana was particularly inspired by the line, "No Surrender, No Retreat, Only the hard, only the strong, Against all odds".

Career
In 2014, Montana released his first mixtape, titled Cursed with a Blessing. In September 2015, Montana made a cameo appearance in the popular television show, Empire. In December 2015, Montana and Talley of 300 released a collaborative mixtape titled Gunz and Roses. Staples of this tape included "FGE Cypher" and "Mf's Mad".

On May 20, 2016, Montana released his debut studio album, titled Fire in the Church. The 18-track release, which only included features from his Fly Guy Entertainment labelmates and Kevin Gates, was lauded by XXL magazine for its "heat-seeking bars and thought-provoking metaphors". The album peaked at #95 on the Billboard 200.

On February 10, 2017, Montana released a compilation album with his Fly Guy labelmates, titled No Surrender No Retreat.

Discography

Albums

Studio albums

Mixtapes

Compilation album

Singles

As lead artist

As featured artist

Filmography

References

External links
 
 

1989 births
Living people
African-American male rappers
Rappers from Chicago
Drill musicians
Trap musicians
Gangsta rappers
21st-century American rappers
21st-century American male musicians
MNRK Music Group artists
21st-century African-American musicians
People from Peoria, Illinois